Pistha is a 1997 Indian Tamil-language comedy film directed by K. S. Ravikumar, starring Karthik and Nagma. The film completed a 180-day run in theatres and turned out to be a profitable venture for producer Pyramid Natarajan.

Plot 
Manigandan is a server in a hotel who is a devotee of Lord Ayyappan (the bachelor god). He follows a fasting for Ayyappan and is very sincere and honest.
One day a businessman, named Dharmaraj, visits the hotel where Manigandan works. He admires Manigandan's sincerity and offers him the General Manager job in his factory at Ooty. Dharmaraj takes Manigandan to his factory and office to introduce him to his employees who do not do any work but play games, sit idle, watch TV etc. Innocent Mani does not understand why employees do not work but gets scared that he must manage all of them, a task which was impossible for 419 managers before him.

Manigandan sees a girl who breaks everything she sees, and yet Dharmaraj pays for everything she broke. He finds out that she is Vennila, daughter of Dharmaraj who is a spoilt young lady who cannot be controlled even by her father. Manigandan and Vennila fight frequently. Vennila makes every attempt to get rid of him, but a spark develops between them.

Vennila visits the home of her sister's lover to give money for their expenses. She finds out that she must inherit all her grandfather's property if she can continue to afford money for them. The only way to inherit the property is to get married as per his will. She wants to help her sister, so decides to marry Manigandan and attempts to win his heart. Manigandan also declares his love for Vennila but Dharmaraj objects to the match as Vennila is very dangerous girl and she might spoil his life. He is reluctantly persuaded to accept the marriage, and Manigandan and Vennila get married.

On the day of the marriage, to everybody's surprise, Manigandan is revealed to be an ex-convict. Vennila is shocked by this. It is now Manigandan's turn to overpower Vennila and he begins his game. The rest of the story follows with the fight between Manigandan and Vennila and how Manigandan surpasses Vennila's arrogance. In the end, it is revealed that the sister's lover is actually a crook who is already married and had illicitly socialised with her sister as he wanted to steal her property. In a fight ensuing, Manigandan pushes him and makes him disabled, Vennila asks for forgiveness to Manigandan & Co for her mistakes which they eventually accept. The film ends with Manigandan turning into Ayyappan devotee again.

Cast 
Karthik as Manigandan aka Pistha Mani
Nagma as Vennila
Mouli as Dharmaraj
Manivannan as Manikandan's friend
Sindhu
Balu Anand as Balu, Dharmaraj's servant
Vasu Vikram as Ramakrishnan, Dharmaraj's ex-Manager
Sai Arun
Mansoor Ali Khan as Adv. Adhimoolam
Idichapuli Selvaraj
Kavignar Kalidasan as Hotel owner
Jayashree as Shanti (Guest Appearance)
K. S. Ravikumar in a Special Appearance

Soundtrack 
The music was composed by S. A. Rajkumar and lyrics were penned by Kavignar Kalidasan.

Release and reception 
Balaji Thirumalai from Indolink said it was a "fun movie" and that "the second half of the film was a tremendous laugh riot". Kousi from Kalki wrote that if viewers discard all logic and fool themselves, they can laugh for two hours without questioning anything.

References

External links 

1990s Tamil-language films
1997 comedy films
1997 films
Films directed by K. S. Ravikumar
Films scored by S. A. Rajkumar
Indian comedy films